Vladimir Tikhonov (born on February 5, 1973), well known as his pen name Pak Noja, is a Russian-born South Korean academic of Korean studies, and columnist.

Biography
Pak was born as Vladimir Tikhonov to a Jewish family in Leningrad, Soviet Union. His Russian name is Vladimir Tikhonov (Russian: Владимир Тихонов), but after immigrating to South Korea in 1997, he changed his name into a Korean name, Pak Noja and became naturalized as a South Korean citizen in 2001.
 
Fascinated by Korean movies and classical literature during his high school days, he decided to study Korean history. In his 16th year, he entered the department of Korean studies at St. Petersburg National University of Russia, and he made his first visit to Korea as an exchange student in 1991 and stayed in Seoul for about 3 months.

After his bachelor's degree, Pak kept studying Korean history and was granted a doctorate from Moscow State University with his thesis about Gaya, a combination of city states which lasted until the 6th century in southern part of Korea.
 
While working on his degree, in 1992, Pak met a Korean violinist, Paik Myong-jong (백명정, 1971- ) who was at that time studying at the Leningrad University of Russia; they married in 1995.
 
Pak worked on translating Korean literature into Russian and wrote several liberal arts and sociology books about Korean culture and politics, including his best-selling book, ‘your Korea (당신들의 대한민국)’. His writings made him known as one of Korea’s influential progressive intellectuals, and brought on many controversial issues within Korea by sharp criticism.

Pak has taught Russian at Kyunghee University of Korea, and is currently teaching Korean studies as a professor at the Department of Culture Studies and Oriental Languages, University of Oslo in Norway.

Statements on China
In 2009, he made the remark that the "Korean economy will be annexed by the Chinese economic zone within 5–10 years". The Korean left responded critically to this claim, but Pak went on to clarify his thesis. According to his column, "it is not proper, I just said inescapable".

Moreover, he supported the Chinese government with respect to Liu Xiaobo's Nobel Peace Prize. Pak criticized Liu Xiaobo as a "follower of Western countries" and "a supporter of colonialism in China". According to Pak, "the process of democratization in China is not only elite, but also working-class".

Pak suggests that Liu's support in his Charter 08 of 'legislative democracy' and the 'protection of private property' raises doubts on whether "Liu Xiaobo wants a 'non-communist, dictatorial China' or a 'worker-friendly China'". Pak claims that "true reform must be undertaken by the working class".

Bibliography
Your Korea 2 (당신들의 대한민국2, 2006)
 I Accuse of the Century of Violence (나는 폭력의 세기를 고발한다, 2005)
 The History which Betrayed Me (나를 배반한 역사, 2003)
 There are Right and Left but not High and Low (좌우는 있어도 위아래는 없다 (박노자의 북유럽 탐험), 2002)
 Your Korea 1 (당신들의 대한민국1, 2001)
 Imaginative Power Changing the 21st Century (6인 6색 21세기를 바꾸는 상상력, 2005)
 Surviving in a Swirl of the Great Powers (열강의 소용돌이에서 살아남기, 2005)
 Realization in My Early Days (젊은 날의 깨달음, 2005)
 The Age of Anxieties, in the Middle of Pain (불안의 시대 고통의 한복판에서, 2005)
 The Empire of a White Mask (하얀 가면의 제국 (오리엔탈리즘, 서구 중심의 역사를 넘어), 2003)
 Outsiders 6,8,10,12,13  (아웃사이더 6,8,10,12,13, 2002~2003)
 In the Front Line of Our History (우리 역사 최전선, 2003)
 Monuments of Deserters (탈영자들의 기념비, 2003)

References

External links
 Private homepage
Private homepage about East Asia
Interview (English)
Blog (Korean)

1973 births
Jewish socialists
Jewish writers
Koreanists
Korean socialists
Labor Party (South Korea) politicians
Living people
Naturalized citizens of South Korea
New Progressive Party (South Korea) politicians
Russian emigrants to South Korea
Russian Jews
Russian writers
Russian socialists
South Korean progressives
South Korean left-wing activists
South Korean historians
South Korean people of Russian-Jewish descent
South Korean socialists
Academic staff of the University of Oslo